The Pakistan fan-fingered gecko (Ptyodactylus homolepis) is a species of gecko. It is endemic to Pakistan.

References

Ptyodactylus
Reptiles described in 1876